The 2017 season is Birmingham City Ladies Football Club's seventh season in the FA Women's Super League and at the top level of English women's football, being one of the league's foundation clubs. It is the club's first season as a fully integrated set-up of men's side Birmingham City FC. It is also the club's first season under manager Marc Skinner, following David Parker's departure in December 2016.

Following a reorganisation of top-level women's football in England, the 2017 season will only cover half of a traditional season's length, while the FA WSL shifts its calendar to match the traditional autumn-to-spring axis of football in Europe. For the same reason, there is no Champions League qualification nor relegation to be competed for.

First team

New contracts

Transfers

In

Out

Competitions

Women's Super League

Results summary

Results by matchday

Matches

FA Cup

Statistics

Appearances and goals

Players without any appearance are not included.

|-
|colspan="14"|Goalkeepers:
|-

|-
|colspan="14"|Defenders:
|-

|-
|colspan="14"|Midfielders:
|-

|-
|colspan="14"|Forwards:
|-

Honours

 2016–17 PFA Players' Player of the Year:  Ellen White (finalist)
 2016–17 PFA Young Player of the Year:  Jess Carter (winner)
 2016–17 PFA Team of the Year:  Jess Carter

References

2017